College esports in the United States began around 2009. Various schools began forming esports clubs to play any number of video games in collegiate tournaments. While there are thousands of schools that participate in collegiate esports competitions, in 2018, there were at least 73 college varsity esports programs, and by 2019 over 130 college varsity programs. College esports is often viewed as a starting path for gamers that aspire to go professional. Although popular, companies are finding it hard to monetize collegiate esports, especially with the recent COVID-19 situation. On December 9, 2020, North American collegiate partner of Activision-Blizzard's esports system, Tespa announced that it is closing down.

Riot Games Collegiate League of Legends
In 2016, the NACC became the University League of Legends (uLoL) Campus Series, run by CSL, after IvyLoL and NACL stopped functioning and many of their staff were hired as Riot Games employees to orchestrate their collegiate activities. In the Fall of 2017, Riot Games announced that it would rebrand again as College League of Legends and switch official partners from CSL to Battlefy. In May 2019, Riot Games announced the formation of the Riot Scholastic Association of America (RSAA) as the governing body for collegiate and high school esports for League of Legends.

Esports Collegiate Conference
A conference created on June 10, 2020, by member institutions of the Mid-American Conference.

PlayVS
PlayVS was founded in 2018 and started as a high school esports platform. In January 2020, PlayVS announced they were expanding to the collegiate scene by offering Fortnite. PlayVS has since expanded its title offering to include Rocket League, League of Legends, Overwatch, FIFA and Madden NFL.

National Association of Collegiate Esports 
The National Association of Collegiate Esports, otherwise known as NACE or NAC Esports,  was founded in 2016. As of 2021, its membership includes over 170 colligate organizations. The organization offers competition in Rocket League, League of Legends, Overwatch, and other titles.

List of colleges and universities with esports teams

References

External links
 National Association of Collegiate Esports
 Esports Collegiate Conference